Phytophthora cinnamomi is a soil-borne water mould that produces an infection which causes a condition in plants variously called "root rot", "dieback", or (in certain Castanea species), "ink disease". The plant pathogen is one of the world's most invasive species and is present in over 70 countries around the world.

Host range and symptoms 
The host range for Phytophythora cinnamomi is very broad. It is distributed worldwide and causes disease on hundreds of hosts. The disease affects a range of economic groups, including food crops such as avocado and pineapple as well as trees and woody ornamentals such as Fraser firs, shortleaf pines, loblolly pines, azaleas, camellia, boxwood, causing root rot and dieback. It is a root pathogen that causes root rot and death of host plants. Some symptoms include: wilting, decreased fruit size, decrease in yield, collar rot, gum exudation, necrosis, leaf chlorosis, leaf curl, and stem cankers. Another symptom is that it can cause dieback of young shoots and may interfere with transpiration of roots to shoots. Older plants may not exhibit symptoms or may display only mild dieback despite having severe root rot.

Life cycle and effects on plants 
Phytophthora cinnamomi lives in the soil and in plant tissues, can take different shapes and can move in water. During periods of harsh environmental conditions, the organisms become dormant chlamydospores. When environmental conditions are suitable, the chlamydospores germinate, producing mycelia (or hyphae) and sporangia. The sporangia ripen and release zoospores, which infect plant roots by entering the root behind the root tip. Zoospores need water to swim through the soil, therefore infection is most likely in moist soils. Mycelia grow throughout the root absorbing carbohydrates and nutrients, destroying the structure of the root tissues, "rotting" the root, and preventing the plant from absorbing water and nutrients. Sporangia and chlamydospores form on the mycelia of the infected root, and the cycle of infection continues to the next plant.

Early symptoms of infection include wilting, yellowing and retention of dried foliage and darkening of root color. Infection often leads to death of the plant, especially in dry summer conditions when plants may be water stressed.

Environment
Phytophthora cinnamomi is a soil-borne pathogen first reported in tropical and subtropical countries, but is now found to be able to survive and develop in cooler countries as well. P. cinnamomi is spread as zoospores and/or chlamydospores in soil and water are placed in favorable conditions, such as warm and moist conditions. Some pathway vectors for spread include: plants or parts of plants – such as mycelial growth through root contact and zoospore dispersal, which can travel long distances; wind-blown soil and debris; downslope movement in subsurface or surface flow of water, such as in rivers or irrigation water; machinery and equipment in moist soil that is stuck to vehicles or equipment; soil, sand, and gravel. Wild and feral animals have also been known to contribute to the spread of disease. A recent study on feral pigs found them to have the ability to transport this pathogen in their digestive tract. Humans also affect the spread of this disease in human activities such as timber harvesting, mining, bush walking, and road.

Sexual reproduction
Phytophthora cinnamomi is a diploid and heterothallic species with two mating types, A1 and A2.  Sexual reproduction in heterothallic Phytophthora species ordinarily occurs when gametangia of opposite mating type interact in host tissue.  This interaction leads to the formation of oospores that can survive for long periods in or outside the host. Phytophthora cinnamomi is also capable of self-fertilization (i.e. it can be homothallic).  Phytophthora cinnamomi mating type A2 cultures can be induced to undergo sexual reproduction by exposure to damaging conditions, that is by exposure to hydrogen peroxide or mechanical damage.

In the wild
When Phytophthora dieback spreads to native plant communities, it kills many susceptible plants, resulting in a permanent decline in the biodiversity and a disruption of ecosystem processes. It can also change the composition of the forest or native plant community by increasing the number of resistant plants and reducing the number of susceptible plant species. Native animals that rely on susceptible plants for survival are reduced in numbers or are eliminated from sites infested by Phytophthora dieback.

Damage to forests suspected to be caused by Phytophthora cinnamomi was first recorded in the United States about 200 years ago. Infection is the cause of sudden death of a number of native tree species, including American chestnut, littleleaf disease of shortleaf pine (Pinus echinata), Christmas tree disease in nursery grown Fraser fir (Abies fraseri), while oaks are affected from South Carolina to Texas.

In Australia, where it is known as phytophthora dieback, dieback, jarrah dieback or cinnamon fungus, Phytophthora cinnamomi infects a number of native plants, causing damage to forests and removing habitats for wildlife.

Of particular concern is the infection and dieback of large areas of forest and heathland which support threatened species in the south-west corner of Western Australia.  Many plants from the genera Banksia, Darwinia, Grevillea, Leucopogon, Verticordia and Xanthorrhoea are susceptible.  This in turn will impact on animals reliant on these plants for food and shelter, such as the southwestern pygmy possum (Cercartetus concinnus) and the honey possum (Tarsipes rostratus). A study in the Perth region found that dieback caused a significant shift in the bird community and affected nectar-feeding species the most, with fewer species such as the Western Spinebill in areas that were dieback-infested.

Phytophthora cinnamomi is also a problem in the Mexican state of Colima, killing several native oak species and other susceptible vegetation in the surrounding woodlands. It is implicated in the die-off of the rare endemic shrub Ione manzanita (Arctostaphylos myrtifolia) in California, as well.

In addition to damage to native woodlands, Phytophthora cinnamomi can also infect fruit trees, nut trees and other ornamental plants. Research has shown that Phytophthora cinnamomi can infect club mosses, ferns, cycads, conifers, cord rushes, grasses, lilies and a large number of species from many dicotyledonous families. This is a remarkable range for a plant pathogen and highlights the effectiveness of Phytophthora cinnamomi as an aggressive primary pathogen. The Invasive Species Specialist Group includes this species in its list of "100 of the World's Worst Invasive Alien Species". The potential range of this pathogen is expected to extend northward with warming of the climate.

In gardens and crops
Phytophthora dieback affects a large number of common garden species, natives and horticultural crops.  This list of susceptible plants includes cinnamon, roses, azaleas and fruit trees. Since there is no known cure, once the disease has been introduced into a garden it cannot be easily eradicated, and can become a major problem.

Protocols to prevent the disease from entering gardens include sourcing plants from non-dieback infested areas (not local bushland), using sterilised potting mixes, and using only mulch that has been properly composted.  Transplanting established plants from one garden to another can also spread the disease. Propagating from seed and cuttings is less likely to transmit the disease because there is no soil transported with stock.

Many nurseries are accredited under the Nursery Industry Accreditation Scheme Australia (NIASA) and use hygienic practices to prevent Phytophthora dieback from infecting their stock.  Hygienic practices prevent the spread of the disease in contaminated potting mix, plant material and water sources.  Other preventative measures include raised benches, regular testing for phytophthora dieback, and the placing of new stock in quarantine.

Plants typically die from phytophthora dieback at the end of summer when the plants are under the most stress.  For this reason phytophthora dieback can often be confused with symptoms of drought.  Phytophthora dieback will affect a range of different susceptible plants, but will not affect resistant plant species.  If the disease is suspected, a likely mode of disease transmission should be identified.  The best method to confirm the presence of the disease is testing of soil and/or plant samples by a diagnostic laboratory.

Control of existing Phytophthora infestations includes injecting or spraying plants with phosphite (a fungicide), using well-composted mulch, and using pre-planting techniques such as solarisation or biofumigation. Composted mulch is highly suppressive to phytophthora dieback and can prevent healthy plants getting infected.  It is most important to prevent the spread of infected soil, plants or water.  Infested areas can be revegetated or landscaped with resistant plant species that are not affected by the disease.

Impact on avocado farming 
Phytophthora cinnamomi is the leading cause of damage to avocado trees, and is commonly known as "root rot" amongst avocado farmers.  Since the 1940s various breeds of root rot-resistant avocados have been developed to minimize tree damage.  Damaged trees generally die or become unproductive within three to five years.  A 1960 study of the Fallbrook, California area correlated higher levels of avocado root rot to soils with poorer drainage and greater clay content.

Management 
P. cinnamomi has a wide host range that makes it difficult to control the spread of disease. The greatest impact tends to be in areas with a Mediterranean climate, which receives a mean annual rainfall above 600 mm such as Southeast Asia islands and Australia. The pathogen is shown to be able to survive in plants displaying no symptoms or in tolerant plants. Some possible cultural management methods include: sanitation, raised plant beds, crop rotation, soil solarization, soil conditions, and establishing a barrier. Sanitation is crucial in management. This means using clean seed and stock as well as well-drained sandy soils with a low pH. This would also mean not allowing soil or water to move from infested areas by using clean bins and equipment, installing watertight drains to prevent surface run off, and work last in diseased areas after harvesting healthy areas first.

Another way to reduce the severity and spread of disease is through planting in raised beds. This will then reduce the contact of water with plant roots and promoting rapid drainage as moisture is a key factor in the establishment, spread, and longevity of diseases caused by this pathogen. For specific plants such as young avocado plants, soil solarization may be used, and an integrated approach is generally taken to control disease on avocado. The process includes radiant heat from the sun trapped under clear polythene sheets laid on the surface of the soil.

Some chemical means of control include: fumigating and certain phosphonate fungistats. A tactic that may be effective, dependent on spores, would be fumigating before planting. However, this would not be effective for eradicating chlamydospores since they are present deeper down in the soil, so fumigation may not reach them. Some experts do not recommend fumigation as P. cinnamomi is often able to re-invade fumigated soil and could cause worse damage since the competing microorganisms in the soil microbial community may be reduced by fumigation. Phosphonate fungistats can improve the ability of a tree to tolerate, resist, or recover from disease by Phytophthora cinnamomi. Phosphite has been used to limit the disease with some success and has been recognized as a major strategy for disease prevention. Phosphite is administered to plants through direct foliage sprays, aerial application by aircraft or through direct injection.

Phosphite fungicide treatment 

Phosphite (phosphonate) salts, such as potassium phosphite, have been used as a biodegradable fungicide to protect plants against phytophthora dieback. It is usually applied as potassium phosphite. Calcium and magnesium phosphite may also be used. No treatment will eradicate phytophthora dieback, including phosphite treatments, although an integrated approach can control the spread and impact of the disease. An integrated approach may combine strategic phosphite treatment, fumigants, controlling access, correcting drainage problems, removal of host plants and implementing excellent hygiene protocols.

Phosphite is not toxic to people or animals.  Its toxicity has been compared to that of table salt. Phosphite poses little environmental impact. When phosphite is sprayed on the foliage of plants, it is applied at a very low rate. Overuse may, however, harm the plant, especially when the plant is starved of phosphate.

Phosphite needs to enter a plant's water transport system in order for it to be effective. This can be done by injecting phosphite into trees, or spraying the leaves of understorey plants. Phosphite not only protects a plant from phytophthora dieback infection, it can also help a plant to recover if it is already infected.

See also 
 Chlorosis
 Forest pathology

References

External links 
 
 
 
 
 
 
 
 
 
 fact sheet of the Global Invasive Species database
 
 

cinnamomi
Water mould plant pathogens and diseases
Avocado tree diseases